Diego Guevara, O.S.A. (1568–1621) was a Roman Catholic prelate who served as Bishop of Nueva Caceres (1616–1621).

Biography
Diego Guevar was born in Baeza, Spain in 1568 and ordained a priest in the Order of Saint Augustine.
On 3 August 1616, he was appointed during the papacy of Pope Paul V as Bishop of Nueva Caceres.
In 1616, he was consecrated bishop by Pedro Castro Quiñones, Archbishop of Seville.
He served as Bishop of Nueva Caceres until his death in 1621.

References

External links and additional sources
 (for Chronology of Bishops) 
 (for Chronology of Bishops) 

17th-century Roman Catholic bishops in the Philippines
Bishops appointed by Pope Paul V
1621 deaths
People from Baeza
Augustinian bishops
1568 births
Roman Catholic bishops of Cáceres